4 Clowns is a 1970 documentary compilation film written and directed by Robert Youngson that studies the golden age of comedy through a compilation of rare silent film footage of the works of Stan Laurel, Oliver Hardy, Charley Chase and Buster Keaton. It was the last feature film project of producer, director, and writer Robert Youngson.

Synopsis
The film is divided into three sections. The first section deals with early silent film works of Laurel and Hardy prior to the two becoming a team as well as their later work as a team. The second section deals with the career of Charley Chase. The third section deals with Buster Keaton,  The film is a compilation of excerpts from some of these actor's more notable projects.

Cast
Narrated by Jay Jackson, the film concentrates on the works of Stan Laurel, Oliver Hardy, Charley Chase, and Buster Keaton.

Included in film's excerpts are actors Jean Arthur, Lori Bara, T. Roy Barnes, Bartine Burkett, Rosalind Byrne, Erwin Connelly, Jules Cowles, Doris Deane, Hazel Deane, Ruth Dwyer, Snitz Edwards, Connie Evans, Eugenia Gilbert, Edna Hammon, Marion Harlan, Jean C. Havez, Barbara Kent, Judy King, Frances Raymond, Viola Richard, Constance Talmadge, Pauline Toller, and Billy West.

Post-production
After Robert Youngson completed 4 Clowns, distribution rights were acquired by 20th Century-Fox in May 1970, and a release date was set. After its 1970 release, the film also aired commercially in the United Kingdom in 1992 and 1995 on Channel Four.

Reception
Leonard Maltin stated that the film was one of the best of Robert Youngson's compilations, and as it contained excerpts from "some of the best silent comedy ever", it was "a must for viewers of all ages."

See also
 List of American films of 1970

References

External links
 4 Clowns at the Internet Movie Database

1970 documentary films
1970 films
Documentary films about the cinema of the United States
American documentary films
Documentary films about comedy and comedians
Laurel and Hardy
Buster Keaton
20th Century Fox films
American anthology films
Compilation films
1970s English-language films
1970s American films
English-language documentary films